Oya Başar (born 11 February 1956) is a Turkish actress.

Early life and career 
At the age of 8, Başar joined the Istanbul City Theatres. After finishing her education in Istanbul, she took part in various plays. She then worked for Devekuşu Cabaret, Istanbul Theatre and Ali Poyrazoğlu Theatre. She then made her television debut, before meeting Levent Kırca and founding a theatre company with him. Her breakthrough came with the 1986 series Olacak O Kadar, which she produced, directed, and acted in together with her husband. In 2007, she was diagnosed with breast cancer and took a break from acting but later recovered. She then joined Şehir Theatres and appeared in the Yedi Kocalı Hürmüz musical. Başar continues her career in cinema and television.

Personal life 
Başar married actor Levent Kırca in 1985. Together they had two children, Umut Kırca and Ayşe Kırca. The couple divorced in 2000, but remarried in 2001 before divorcing again in 2005. Levent Kırca died in 2015.

Başar does not use social media and has stated that she doesn't take what is written on these media into consideration.

Filmography

Theatre 
Kadın ile Memur - BKM
Yedi Kocalı Hürmüz - Istanbul City Theatre
Üç Baba Hasan - Oya Başar Levent Kırca Theatre
Seferi Ramazan Beyin Nafile Dünyası - Oya Başar Levent Kırca Theatre
Gereği Düşünüldü - Oya Başar Levent Kırca Theatre
Morfin - Ali Poyrazoğlu Theatre
Haneler - Devekuşu Cabaret

References

External links 
 

1956 births
Turkish film actresses
Turkish stage actresses
Turkish television actresses
Turkish comedians
Turkish women comedians
Living people